These are the official results of the Men's 400 metres event at the 2001 IAAF World Championships in Edmonton, Canada. There were a total number of 55 participating athletes, with seven qualifying heats, three semi-finals and the final held on Monday 6 August 2001 at 18:25h.

Medalists

Records

Final

Semi-finals
Held on Sunday 5 August 2001

Heats
Held on Tuesday 7 August 2001

References
 Finals Results
 Semi-finals results
 Heats results

H
400 metres at the World Athletics Championships